The enthesis (plural entheses) is the connective tissue between tendon or ligament and bone.

There are two types of entheses: Fibrous entheses and fibrocartilaginous entheses.

In a fibrous enthesis, the collagenous tendon or ligament directly attaches to the bone. 

In a fibrocartilaginous enthesis, the interface presents a gradient that crosses four transition zones:

 Tendinous area displaying longitudinally oriented fibroblasts and a parallel arrangement of collagen fibres
 Fibrocartilaginous region of variable thickness where the structure of the cells changes to chondrocytes
 Abrupt transition from cartilaginous to calcified fibrocartilage—often called 'tidemark' or 'blue line'
 Bone

Clinical significance
A disease of the entheses is known as an enthesopathy or enthesitis. 

Enthetic degeneration is characteristic of spondyloarthropathy and other pathologies.

The enthesis is the primary site of disease in ankylosing spondylitis.

Society and culture

Bioarchaeology 
Entheses are widely recorded in the field of bioarchaeology where the presence of anomalies at these sites, called entheseal changes, has been used to infer repetitive loading to study the division of labour in past populations. Several different recording methods have been proposed to record the variety of changes seen at these sites. However, research has shown that, whichever recording method is used, entheseal changes occur more frequently in older individuals.  Research demonstrates that diseases, such as ankylosing spondylitis and calcific tendinitis, also have to be taken into consideration.  Experimental studies have demonstrated how loading history (physical activity) can increase the relative size of muscle attachment sites.

History
"Enthesis" is rooted in the Ancient Greek word, "ἔνθεσις" or "énthesis," meaning “putting in," or "insertion." This refers to the role of the enthesis as the site of attachment of bones with tendons or ligaments. Relatedly, in muscle terminology, the insertion is the site of attachment at the end with predominant movement or action (opposite of the origin). Thus the words (enthesis and insertion [of muscle]) are proximal in the semantic field, but insertion in reference to muscle can refer to any relevant aspect of the site (i.e., the attachment per se, the bone, the tendon, or the entire area), whereas enthesis refers to the attachment per se and to ligamentous attachments as well as tendinous ones.

See also 
 Sharpey's fibres

References

External links 
 Enthesis information site at www.enthesis.info
 Image of enthesis at Medscape
 Enthesopathy and Soft Tissue Shadows at chiroweb.com

Further reading 
 

Musculoskeletal system